Michael Hannan (20 July 1821 – 17 April 1882) was a Roman Catholic priest and archbishop.

Born in  County Limerick, Republic of Ireland, Hannan came to Halifax in 1840 to teach and finish his studies for the priesthood. Hannan was ordained by Archbishop William Walsh in 1845 and became a parish priest in Bermuda which was part of the Roman Catholic Archdiocese of Halifax at the time. He returned to Nova Scotia in 1847 and served in increasingly important positions within the archdiocese.
 
He served as archbishop from 1877 to 1882 and was followed by Cornelius O'Brien.

References 
 

1821 births
1882 deaths
19th-century Irish Roman Catholic priests
Irish emigrants to pre-Confederation Nova Scotia
Clergy from County Limerick
19th-century Roman Catholic archbishops in Canada
Roman Catholic archbishops of Halifax